Spirit Mound Creek is a tributary of the Vermillion River, located in the southeastern South Dakota county of Clay.  It passes through the Spirit Mound Historic Prairie.

See also
List of rivers of South Dakota

References

Rivers of South Dakota
Rivers of Clay County, South Dakota